Ilse Salas (born 26 August 1981) is a Mexican actress. She appeared in more than fifteen films since 2010. For her lead role in the films Güeros and The Good Girls Salas received two nominations for the Ariel Award for Best Actress and won for the latter one.

Filmography

Film roles

Television roles

References

External links 

1981 births
Ariel Award winners
Living people
Mexican film actresses